Wallasey Cricket Club is a cricket club in Wallasey, Merseyside, England. The club was founded in 1864 and was an early member of the Liverpool and District Cricket Competition in which it still plays. It joined the then Liverpool Competition in 1919, taking over the fixtures of the Rock Ferry club which had not re-formed after World War I.

References

External links

Cricket clubs established in the 19th century
Cricket in Merseyside
English club cricket teams
Cricket clubs established in 1864